Wilfried Moimbé-Tahrat (born 18 October 1988) is a French professional footballer who most recently played as a defender for Minnesota United in Major League Soccer.

Career
Moimbé played for the main squad of FC Girondins de Bordeaux on 19 December 2007 in a final group stage game of the 2007–08 UEFA Cup against Panionios F.C., coming on as a substitute in the 81st minute and scoring the winning goal on the 87th minute.

On 9 June 2015, Moimbé joined FC Nantes on a three-year deal.

On 31 January 2018, Moimbé signed for Oldham Athletic on a short-term deal until the end of the 2017–2018 season.

In September 2018, Moimbé signed with AS Nancy in French Ligue 2 as a free agent.

On 23 July 2019, Moimbé joined MLS side Minnesota United. He was released by Minnesota at the end of the season.

References

External links
(1) https://www.ouest-france.fr/bretagne/brest-29200/wilfried-moimbe-entre-kabylie-et-reunion-1640954

 

1988 births
Living people
People from Vichy
Sportspeople from Allier
Association football midfielders
French footballers
French people of Martiniquais descent
Ligue 2 players
FC Girondins de Bordeaux players
Stade de Reims players
AC Ajaccio players
Tours FC players
Stade Brestois 29 players
FC Nantes players
Oldham Athletic A.F.C. players
AS Nancy Lorraine players
Minnesota United FC players
Major League Soccer players
Footballers from Auvergne-Rhône-Alpes